The 2015 Queensland state election was held on 31 January 2015.

A total of 433 candidates nominated for the 2015 election, by the close of nominations on 13 January 2015. There were three more candidates than there were at the last election in 2012, and the number of candidates is five short of the record number of 438 candidates at the 1998 state election.

Retiring Members

Labor
Tim Mulherin (Mackay) – announced 9 January 2015
Desley Scott (Woodridge) – announced 11 March 2014

LNP
 Peter Dowling (Redlands) – deselected 25 October 2014
 Bruce Flegg (Moggill) – deselected 7 December 2014
 David Gibson (Gympie) – announced 2 May 2014
 Howard Hobbs (Warrego) – announced 5 September 2014
 Vaughan Johnson (Gregory) – announced 2 October 2014
 Ted Malone (Mirani) – announced 26 September 2014
 Rosemary Menkens (Burdekin) – announced 19 September 2014

Independent
 Liz Cunningham (Gladstone) – announced 6 January 2015

Legislative Assembly
Sitting members are shown in bold text. Successful candidates are highlighted in the relevant colour. Where there is possible confusion, an asterisk (*) is also used.

References
Green, Antony. Queensland election guide, 2015
List of nominations

Candidates for Queensland state elections